Tomaž Knafelj (born 11 April 1972) is a Slovenian snowboarder. He competed at the 2002 Winter Olympics and the 2006 Winter Olympics.

References

1972 births
Living people
Slovenian male snowboarders
Olympic snowboarders of Slovenia
Snowboarders at the 2002 Winter Olympics
Snowboarders at the 2006 Winter Olympics
Sportspeople from Jesenice, Jesenice